Hub Culture is an invitation-led social network service that operates its own digital currency Ven. Hub Culture is located in Bermuda,. Founded in 2002, it claims it had 32,000 members by 2021 - based on registered accounts.

History
In November 2002, Hub Culture was founded by Stan Stalnaker. It was named after his book Hub Culture: The Next Wave of Urban Consumers published in the same year. 

In 2006 and 2008, United Kingdom operations where incorporated, Hub Culture Services and Hub Culture Pavilions, respectively.

As of March 2017, Hub Culture claimed to have 25,000 members, although this is impossible to verify. 

In 2020 Hub Culture launched AQUA, the Active Quarantine User Ally, a HubID based health and travel service created during the COVID-19 pandemic. By 2021, the network claimed it had 32,000 accounts.

Organisation
The Hub Culture group of companies is privately held with offices in Bermuda, Hong Kong, United Kingdom and the United States.

Ven Currency

Launched in 2007, Ven is a Digital currency used by members of Hub Culture to buy, share and trade knowledge, goods and services. Anyone in the network and can use Ven at any 'Pavilion' or used for micropayments online. The value of Ven is determined on the financial markets from a basket of currencies, commodities and carbon futures. It trades against other major currencies at floating exchange rates. Global pricing for Ven is provided by Thomson Reuters.

Pavilions
In 2008, Hub Culture established its first 'Pavilions', coworking project spaces in cities that offer concierge and consulting services, meeting space, on an internet enabled technology platform.  Pavilions may be either temporary and permanent. They have been opened in Beijing, Bermuda, Cannes, Cancún, Copenhagen, Davos, Glasgow, Ho Chi Minh City, Ibiza, London, Los Angeles, New York City, Marrakech, Miami, Paris, Rio de Janeiro, Sacramento, Southampton, St. Moritz and Venice. Among these locations, in December 2009 was a Pavilion in Copenhagen to coincide with COP15, a beachfront location in Cancún to coincide with COP16, and a guest house location in Durban for COP17.

Between 2009 and 2020 temporary Pavilions opened in Davos, Switzerland during the World Economic Forum Annual Meeting. "Hub Maison" arrived in New York City for New York Fashion Week in its first fashion oriented collaboration with Sportmax. The New York Pavilion became the first Pavilion to offer contemporary retail fashion selections for sale in digital currency. In May 2010, Hub Culture opened the Cannes Clubhouse, a venue tied to the 63rd Cannes Film Festival in collaboration with Grey Goose. A private island in Croatia and Bali villa project also use Ven as a means of exchange.  The 2011 Davos Pavilion made history with the first vehicles available for sale in Ven, with the all-electric Nissan LEAF on offer. In 2012, portions of the Davos Pavilion became the first in Europe to be powered by zero-emission energy from the Nissan Leaf using the Leaf-to-Home energy system.

In 2017, The Hub Culture Innovation Campus and Beach Club in Bermuda featured expanded HubID. The digitial id system included objects and entities, allowing members to store Ven (currency) in company and object accounts representing digital personas, vehicles, surfboards, bicycles and other inanimate objects.

In the summer of 2017, during the 35th America's Cup Hub Culture opened several shipping containers  that were serving drinks at Ariel Sands in Bermuda.  The company claimed the popup bar featured integration of artificial intelligence, digital currency, digital identity and blockchain auditing in a retail environment. In 2018, the Innovation Campus appeared in Paris, Cannes and Monaco over six weeks. In 2019 it appeared in Capri, Italy over two weeks. In Bermuda,the project was followed by the Bermuda Innovation Sprint, a two-week event gathering global Fintech leaders for meetings and other activities.

HubID
In January 2014, Hub Culture announced HubID an open source digital identity system based on MIT Media Lab open source technology that extends data ownership around identity to the individual user.

Ultra
Launched in 2018, Ultra is a private client Cryptocurrency Exchange using HubID and other Hub Culture technologies to enable the exchange of digital assets, including tokenised assets. The concept for Ultra emerged from the Bermuda Innovation Campus and Beach Club.  In addition to trading tokenized assets, Ultra Carbon, a digital carbon token, was the first asset to be presented on the exchange.

AQUA
Launched in 2020, AQUA, (Active Quarantine User Ally) is COVID-19 pandemic service attempting to help travellers manage international health quarantines.

References

External links

 

Bermudian social networking websites
Digital currencies